The Kletsel Dehe Wintun Nation of the Cortina Rancheria is a federally recognized tribe of Indigenous people of California. They are Wintun people, who historically spoke Wintuan languages.

Their headquarters are in Williams, California, and they have approximately 117 enrolled members. They were previously known as the Kletsel Dehe Band of Wintun Indians, Cortina Indian Rancheria, and Cortina Indian Rancheria of Wintun Indians of California.

Government 
Charlie Wright serves as their chairperson.

Rancheria 
The Cortina Rancheria is an Indian reservation in Colusa County, California, at an elevation of 1,312 feet (400 m). The rancheria is 640 acres large in area.It is located about 70 miles northwest of Sacramento and 15 miles west of Arbuckle, California. As of the 2010 Census the population was 21.

Activities 
The tribe partnered with California State University, Chico, to study water quality and purification systems.

See also 
 Wintu-Nomlaki traditional narratives

References

External links 

 Kletsel Dehe Wintun Nation, official website

 Cortina Rancheria Band of Wintun Indians

Wintun
Federally recognized tribes in the United States
Unincorporated communities in California
Unincorporated communities in Colusa County, California
Native American populated places